The planalto foliage-gleaner (Syndactyla dimidiata), also known as the russet-mantled foliage-gleaner, is a species of bird in the family Furnariidae. It is found in Brazil and Paraguay. Its natural habitat is subtropical or tropical moist lowland forest.

References

planalto foliage-gleaner
Birds of Brazil
Birds of Paraguay
planalto foliage-gleaner
Taxonomy articles created by Polbot